The City of Bradford Metropolitan District Council elections were held on Thursday, 4 May 1995, with one third of the council up for election. Prior to the election there had been a by-election in Tong after incumbent Labour councillor, Gerry Sutcliffe, was selected as their candidate for the Bradford South by-election, which Labour successfully defended. Labour retained control of the council.

Election result

|- style="background-color:#F9F9F9"
! style="background-color: " |
| Militant Labour
| align="right" | 0
| align="right" | 0
| align="right" | 0
| align="right" | 
| align="right" | 0.0
| align="right" | 0.2
| align="right" | 312
| align="right" | +0.2%
|-

This result had the following consequences for the total number of seats on the council after the elections:

Ward results

|- style="background-color:#F9F9F9"
! style="background-color: " |
| Militant Labour
| H. Oakes
| align="right" | 312
| align="right" | 9.1
| align="right" | +9.1
|-

References

1995 English local elections
1995
1990s in West Yorkshire